The Dofteana is a right tributary of the river Trotuș in Romania. It discharges into the Trotuș in the village Dofteana.

References

Rivers of Romania
Rivers of Bacău County